The 1993 Deutsche Tourenwagen Meisterschaft was the tenth season of premier German touring car championship and also eighth season under the moniker of Deutsche Tourenwagen Meisterschaft. It was the first DTM to utilize FIA Class 1 Touring Cars regulations which limited engines to a maximum of six cylinders and 2.5 litres capacity, but allowed liberal modifications to engine, chassis and aerodynamics. Italian driver Nicola Larini won the championship for Alfa Corse after scoring 11 wins (series record) ahead of Roland Asch and Bernd Schneider, both driving for the AMG-Mercedes team.

Teams and drivers

Numbers from 51 entered the 2000 Cup, drivers with the asterisk took part at Donington non-championship round.

Schedule and results

Driver standings/results
Points system is as follows: 1st=20, 2nd=15, 3rd=12, 4th=10, 5th=8, 6th=6, 7th=4, 8th=3, 9th=2, 10th=1

† Not classified in championship due to only entering in non-championship event.

‡ Non-championship event.

References

External links

Deutsche Tourenwagen Masters seasons
1993 in German motorsport